Ameroglossum is a genus of Linderniaceae, containing the species Ameroglossum pernambucense endemic to the Borborema Plateau in Pernambuco, and Ameroglossum manoelfelixii found in Paraíba, in north-eastern Brazil. The species are only found on granitic rocky outcrops. The species are threatened by drought, fires, quarrying, trampling and cattle pasturing.

References 

Scrophulariaceae
Monotypic Lamiales genera
Endemic flora of Brazil
Flora of Paraíba
Flora of Pernambuco
Endangered plants